Guinardia is a genus of diatoms belonging to the family Rhizosoleniaceae.

The genus was first described by H. Peragallo in 1892.

The genus has cosmopolitan distribution.

Species:
 Guinardia delicatula
 Guinardia flaccida
 Guinardia pungens
 Guinardia striata

References

Diatoms
Diatom genera